Ku Cheng-kang or Gu Zhenggang (30 April 1902 – 11 December 1993) was a Chinese politician, scholar and ranking member of the Kuomintang in service to the Republic of China.

Biography 

Ku Cheng-kang was born in Anshun, Guizhou Province during the late Qing Empire. He had an older brother , and a younger brother Ku Cheng-ting.

Ku attended school in Germany where many of the Kuomintang's elite were also educated. He obtained his bachelor's degree from Humboldt University of Berlin. In 1924, whilst still a student, Ku and his younger brother joined the Kuomintang.

In 1925, the two brothers traveled to the Soviet Union to continue their studies at Moscow Sun Yat-sen University, a comintern school.

The brothers returned to China in 1926. In 1928, they fell in with Chen Gongbo and Ku Meng-yu to form the Reorganization Clique (zh: 国民党改組同志会, 改組派), one of many Kuomintang factions.

In 1931, Ku caught the eye of Chiang Kai-shek who ordered him to Beijing and Tianjin to participate in party organization activity. Later in the year with the Mukden Incident, Chiang began consolidating the party factions and in December, Ku was elected to the Central Executive Committee of the Kuomintang.

In December 1934, Ku was appointed as the Permanent Secretary of the Ministry of Industry and in 1935, he secured a promotion to serve as Vice Minister of the Kuomintang Central Executive Committee.

In 1937, with the outbreak of the Second Sino-Japanese War, he was appointed Deputy Minister of the 5th National Government Military Commission. In June 1938, he served as interim secretary for the Society of the Three People's Principles Youth League and was also made the group's Central Executive Officer. In addition, he served as KMT Chairman and party boss for Zhejiang Province.

Minister of Social Affairs 

In November 1939, Ku was appointed as the Minister of Social Affairs and was placed in charge of all wartime social welfare projects. In 1940, the ministry was reorganized into the National Social Department where Ku continued to serve as Minister of National Government Social Affairs, a position he held until March 1949.

In 1941, Ku was in charge of casualty processing during the Japanese bombing of Chongqing and in 1944, he was in charge of Chinese military and civilian casualties on the Guangxi, Guizhou warfronts.

In 1945, Ku was elected to the Chinese Kuomintang Central Executive Committee and the 6th Standing Committee. He also served as Chairman of the Chinese Kuomintang Central Committee of agricultural workers.

In 1947, he began involvement with Chen Lifu, Fang Chih and the CC Clique and became active in the Shanghai political scene.

Ku retreated with the nationalists to Taiwan in 1949.

Anti-communist activities in Taiwan 

In January 1950, Ku was appointed Minister of the Interior. He served as Director of the Mainland Disaster Relief Organization together with Fang Chih. Together with Fang, Ku set up the Free China Relief Agency, and the Sino-Laotian Friendship Society and the ROC branch of the Asian People's Anti Communist League. The pair were active in South Korea, Vietnam, Burma, Laos, Camboadia and Thailand on various KMT special projects.

In 1951, he was appointed as a presidential adviser and in 1952, he was elected to the 7th Standing Committee.

Ku died on 11 December 1993 in Taipei at the age of 91.

Marriage and descendants 

Ku married and had five children:
 Ku Chia-tai (zh: 谷家泰)
 Ku Chia-hua (zh: 谷家華)
 Ku Chia-sung (zh: 谷家嵩)
  (zh: 谷秀衡) - She went on to become director of Taiwan Cyanamid Company
 Ku Chia-heng (zh: 谷家恒)

Literary works 
 The following is an incomplete list of the literary works of Ku Cheng-kang
 Ku Cheng-kang 谷正綱編，世盟重要文獻，台北市：世界反共聯盟中華民國分會，1967年
 Ku Cheng-kang 谷正綱，發揚胞愛精神團結反共力量，台北市：中國大陸災胞救濟總會，1973年
 Ku Cheng-kang "Expose and Destroy Peiping's "Peaceful Unification" Intrigue", World Anti-Communist League, China Chapter, 1979, Taipei.
 Ku Cheng-kang "The 12th [Twelfth] C.C.P. Congress and the Future of Teng's Line", World Anti-Communist League, China Chapter, 1982, Taipei.
 Ku Cheng-kang 谷正綱，為人類自由而奮鬥：世盟榮譽主席谷正綱博士言論選集，世盟榮譽主席谷正綱言論選集編委會，1985年

References 

Kuomintang politicians in Taiwan
People from Anshun
People of the Chinese Civil War
Chinese anti-communists
Government ministers of China
1902 births
1993 deaths
Moscow Sun Yat-sen University alumni
Chinese Civil War refugees
Taiwanese people from Guizhou
Taiwanese Ministers of the Interior
Senior Advisors to President Chiang Kai-shek
Republic of China politicians from Guizhou
20th-century Taiwanese politicians